The Malawi Communications Regulatory Authority (MACRA) is the communications regulatory authority in Malawi. It was established as an independent regulatory organization in 1998 as part of the Communications Act. It oversees Malawi's Telecommunications, Broadcasting, Postal Services, and Internet.

History
MACRA is among the three institutions established after the dissolution of Malawi Posts and Telecommunications Corporation (MPTC). MACRA was under Malawi Telecommunications Limited until 1998 when it began to be the authority on communications in Malawi.

External links
 MACRA Site

References

Regulation in Malawi
Telecommunications in Malawi
Organizations established in 1998
1998 establishments in Malawi
Communications authorities